The discography of Macedonian recording artist Elena Risteska consists of three studio albums, nineteen singles and twelve music videos. As feature artist she has three songs. She debuted on the Macedonian music scene with her first album Den i Nok in 2003. Her first single was "Ona drugoto" and with it she won the competition "Play - Search for a new star". With her single "Ninanajna" she represented Macedonia in the Eurovision Song Contest 2006 and it placed on the 12th place in the final. Her first Serbian language album is called Milioner realized in 2008. "Million Dollar Player" is the name of her first English language single and it features Leroy Chambers. Nearly all the melodies are written by her producer Darko Dimitrov and about the lyrics since now she has collaborated with people like: Kaliopi Bukle, Ognen Nedelkovski, Snežana Vukomanović and Aida Buraku. Elena is also a songwriter & has written many of her songs such as: "Dosta" (Enough), "Sakam Po Dobro Da Te Pamtam" (I want to remember you for good) & many more.

Albums

Singles

As featured artist

Music videos

Notes

External links 
  
 Ringeraja na gosti kaj Elena Risteska
Elena Risteska Fansite 

Pop music discographies
Rhythm and blues discographies
Discographies of Macedonian artists